Don't Talk to Strangers (also known as Dangerous Pursuit) is a 1994 Made-for-TV psychological thriller film. It was directed by Robert Lewis and starred Pierce Brosnan.

Plot
The unhappy marriage of Jane (Shanna Reed) and her alcoholic policeman husband Bonner (Terry O'Quinn) leads to divorce and Jane get the custody for their son. Soon, she meets a gentleman in her workplace, after a few weeks they fall in love and get married. Gentleman Douglas Patrick Brody (Pierce Brosnan) and his new wife Jane Brody attempt to build a new life, and move to a new state. However, the former husband follows them. This is just a beginning of the story filled with suspense and surprises.  As it turns out, Patrick Brody (Pierce Brosnan) is the villain behind a number of crimes.

References

External links

1994 television films
1994 films
1990s psychological thriller films
Films shot in British Columbia
American thriller films
1990s English-language films
1990s American films